"America’s Most Beautiful Roadster" or (AMBR) is an award given out at the Grand National Roadster Show since 1950. It was started by Slonaker as a 9-foot "megatrophy" that engraved the winner's name on it. At that time, it was the largest trophy in the world.

List of winners

See also

 List of motor vehicle awards

References

External links 
 History page at Grand National Roadster Show website

Motor vehicle awards